Qaṣr-i Abu Naṣr (Abu-Naṣr Palace), Qasre Abunasr,  or Takht-e Sulayman (Throne of Solomon) is the site of an ancient settlement situated in city of Shiraz in the Fars province of Iran. According to archaeological studies the fortress was built during the Parthian period, and was an important and strategic location in the Sassanid Empire. Archaeologists have found various artifacts and coins belonging to various historical periods, such as the Achaemenid, Seleucid Empire, Parthian and Sassanid. This site is recorded in an Iranian historical list from 1932 as "Takht e Sulayman" ( Throne of Solomon). When Muslims invaded Iran, and conquered it, they called this palace "Father of Victory" (Qaṣr-i-Abu Naṣr)

Name of Shiraz
One of the palaces in this site was named Shiraz, from which the city derives its name.

Notes

References
Wilkinson, C.K., 1965. The Achaemenian Remains at Qaṣr-i-Abu Naṣr. Journal of Near Eastern Studies 24(4): 341-345.
Frye, R.N., 1973. Sasanian Remains from Qasr-i Abu Nasr: Seals, Sealings, and Coins. Vol. 1. Cambridge: Harvard University Press.
Whitcomb, D., 1984. Qasr-i Abu Nasr and the [Persian] Gulf. Arabie Orientale, Mésopotamie at Iran Méridional de l’âge du Fer an début de la Période Islamique. Paris:  Editions Recherche sur les Civilisations, pp.331-37.
Whitcomb, D.S., 1985. Before the Roses and Nightingales: Excavations at Qasr-i Abu Nasr, Old Shiraz. New York: Metropolitan Museum of Art.
Henkelman. Wouter F.M., Jones, Charles E., Stolper, Matthew W. 2006. Achaemenid Elamite Administrative Tablets, 2: The Qasr-i Abu Nasr Tablet. ARTA 2006.003
Simpson, S.J., 2007. Pottering around Persepolis: Observations on Early European Visitors to the Site. Christopher Tuplin (ed.)  Persian Responses: Political and Cultural Interaction With(in) the Achaemenid Empire, Swansea:  The University of Wales Press pp.343-356.
Miri, N., 2009. Historical Geography of Fars during the Sasanian Period.  e-Sasanika 6.

External links
The Metropolitan Museum’s Excavations at Qasr-i Abu Nasr — The Metropolitan Museum of Art, New York
Qasr-e Abu Nasr — Sasanika

Palaces in Iran
Buildings and structures in Shiraz
Parthian architecture